Sasha Andrews (born February 14, 1983, in Edmonton, Alberta) is a Canadian soccer defender who plays for Icelandic club UMF Afturelding in the Úrvalsdeild. She won a bronze medal with the Canadian women's national soccer team at the 2007 Pan American Games.

Career
She has played for Vancouver Whitecaps and Pali Blues in the USL W-League, Linderud-Grei in the Toppserien and Perth Glory in the Australian W-League.

External links
 

1983 births
Living people
Women's association football defenders
Canada women's international soccer players
Canadian expatriate sportspeople in the United States
Canadian expatriate soccer players
Canadian women's soccer players
Expatriate women's soccer players in the United States
Sasha Andrews
Pali Blues players
2003 FIFA Women's World Cup players
Black Canadian women's soccer players
Perth Glory FC (A-League Women) players
Soccer players from Edmonton
USL W-League (1995–2015) players
University of Nebraska alumni
Vancouver Whitecaps FC (women) players
Pan American Games bronze medalists for Canada
SMU Mustangs women's soccer players
Nebraska Cornhuskers women's soccer players
Expatriate women's soccer players in Australia
Pan American Games medalists in football
Sasha Andrews
Footballers at the 2007 Pan American Games
Medalists at the 2007 Pan American Games